Abtu is the name of a sacred fish, according to Egyptian mythology, and of the city of Abydos, the place where Osiris and the early rulers of Egypt were buried.

Abtu as word

Abtu was also the ancient word for the western or west of something. This was then understood as the place where the days passage of the sun across the sky finishes so for ancient Egypt where the sun dies each day and passes into the dark underworld.

Abtu as fish
Evidence of Abtu being known as a sacred fish here is taken from “A Hymn Of Praise To Ra When He Riseth In The Eastern Part Of Heaven” as translated by Robert Guisepi (1984): 

“Let me behold the Abtu Fish at his season.”

Furthermore, the goddess Isis is said to have transformed into the Abtu, perhaps therefore lending to the creature its sacred state. Isis, as 'Abtu, Great Fish of the Abyss,' was identified with the penis-swallower within the city of Oxyrhynchus. The fish cult spread to many parts of Egypt.

Abtu in myth
The mythological Abtu also was known to  accompany the barque of Ra across the sky at sunrise.

References

External links
Godchecker.com
Excerpt of the Book of the Dead

Egyptian mythology
Egyptian legendary creatures
Fish in religion